Asurini may refer to:

Tocantins Asurini language or Akwáwa language, a Tupi–Guarani dialect cluster of Brazil.
Xingu Asurini language, a Tupi–Guaraní language of Brazil